Take Off and Landing is the second solo studio album by Yoshinori Sunahara. It was released on Ki/oon Records on May 21, 1998. It is centered around the fictional Tokyo Underground Airport.

Critical reception

Ben Davies of AllMusic gave the album 2.5 out of 5 stars, writing, "most tracks are too repetitive and drawn out."

Snoozer placed the album at number 26 on the "50 Best Albums of the Year" list.

Track listing

References

External links
 

1998 albums
Yoshinori Sunahara albums
Ki/oon Records albums